Moxee is a small suburban community southeast of Yakima, Washington. Yakima and Moxee are both north of the Yakama Indian Reservation in Yakima County, Washington, United States. The population of Moxee was 4,326 at the 2020 census.

According to the Washington State Office of Financial Management, Moxee ranked 5th of 279 eligible incorporated communities in population growth between 2000 and 2005.

History
Moxee was first settled by Mortimer Thorp and several French-Canadian farmers who arrived in 1867. A warm spring on the Thorp ranch emitted steam year 'round and never froze. It was known as "Moxee" by the native people, a Sahaptin word for an edible root, and was the name was adopted for the settlement. Over time, the community has been variously known as: "Artesian", "Moksee", "Moxie", "Moxee City", and "Moxee."

The sandy soil and mild climate of the region were ideal for growing hops used in the brewing of beer, and for growing grapes. By the turn-of-the century, the Northern Pacific Railroad had completed a railway line nearby and irrigation projects were being constructed making rich, farmland available to new settlers. This attracted more French and French-Canadian farmers who had first immigrated to northern Minnesota and northern Michigan. A French school was established on La Framboise Road and masses at Holy Rosary Parish were said in French up to World War I.

The town of Moxee City was incorporated on April 27, 1921. Street and road names in the vicinity, such as Charron, Faucher, Rivard, Beaudry, Desmarais, Robillard, Beauchene, Gamache, Champoux, Morrier, and St. Hilaire, continue to reflect Moxee's French-Canadian heritage. However, almost one-third of residents are of Hispanic descent today.

In 2016, several homes near Moxie were evacuated because of the Range 12 fire, which ultimately destroyed over tens-of-thousands of acres  in Yakima County.

Geography
Moxee is located at  (46.556499, -120.387119).

Climate
According to the Köppen Climate Classification system, Moxee has a semi-arid climate, abbreviated "BSk" on climate maps.

Demographics

2010 census
As of the census of 2010, there were 3,308 people, 1,014 households, and 809 families residing in the city. The racial makeup of the city was 70.9% White, 0.6% African American, 2.3% Native American, 1.2% Asian, 21.2% from other races, and 3.8% from two or more races. Hispanic or Latino of any race were 39.0% of the population.

There were 1,014 households, of which 57.2% had children under the age of 18 living with them, 56.5% were married couples living together, 15.1% had a female householder with no husband present, 8.2% had a male householder with no wife present, and 20.2% were non-families. 15.5% of all households were made up of individuals, and 4.9% had someone living alone who was 65 years of age or older. The average household size was 3.26 and the average family size was 3.59.

The median age in the city was 27.7 years. 36.5% of residents were under the age of 18; 9.3% were between the ages of 18 and 24; 32.4% were from 25 to 44; 16.4% were from 45 to 64; and 5.3% were 65 years of age or older. The gender makeup of the city was 49.5% male and 50.5% female.

2000 census
As of the census of 2000, there were 821 people, 292 households, and 202 families residing in the city. The population density was 697.3 people per square mile (268.6/km2). There were 307 housing units at an average density of 260.8 per square mile (100.5/km2). The racial makeup of the city was 66.99% White, 0.73% African American, 1.58% Native American, 0.49% Asian, 27.65% from other races, and 2.56% from two or more races. Hispanic or Latino of any race were 31.79% of the population.

There were 192 households, out of which 39.7% had children under the age of 18 living with them, 55.1% were married couples living together, 9.6% had a female householder with no husband present, and 30.5% were non-families. 28.1% of all households were made up of individuals, and 15.4% had someone living alone who was 65 years of age or older. The average household size was 2.80 and the average family size was 3.48.

In the city, the age distribution of the population shows 33.3% under the age of 18, 7.1% from 18 to 24, 30.9% from 25 to 44, 18.4% from 45 to 64, and 10.4% who were 65 years of age or older. The median age was 32 years. For every 100 females, there were 99.8 males. For every 100 females age 18 and over, there were 94.3 males.

The median income for a household in the city was $32,500, and the median income for a family was $40,500. Males had a median income of $35,667 versus $20,313 for females. The per capita income for the city was $14,176. About 7.8% of families and 12.2% of the population were below the poverty line, including 11.8% of those under age 18 and 9.6% of those age 65 or over.

Notable people
 Jeremiah Green (1977–2022), musician

References

External links

 City of Moxee

Cities in Washington (state)
Cities in Yakima County, Washington